Brian Emanuel Nieva (born 18 April 1990) was an Argentine footballer.  

He played for J.J. de Urquiza in the Primera C in Argentine.

External links
 Profile at BDFA
 

1990 births
Living people
Argentine footballers
Argentine expatriate footballers
Club Atlético Independiente footballers
Club Atlético Los Andes footballers
Santiago Morning footballers
Primera B de Chile players
Argentine Primera División players
Expatriate footballers in Chile
Argentine expatriate sportspeople in Chile
Association football forwards
Sportspeople from Avellaneda